John Forsyth (20 December 1918 – February 1995) was a footballer who played as a winger for Dumbarton, New Brighton and Chester.

References

1918 births
1995 deaths
Sportspeople from Clydebank
Footballers from West Dunbartonshire
Association football wingers
Scottish footballers
Dumbarton F.C. players
Luton Town F.C. players
New Brighton A.F.C. players
Chester City F.C. players
English Football League players